The Billboard Hot R&B/Hip-Hop Songs chart ranks the best-performing singles in that category in the United States. The first number one song of the year was claimed by Trey Songz with his song "I Invented Sex", featuring Drake. "I Invented Sex" also spent the last week of 2009 atop the chart, and therefore spent two consecutive weeks atop the chart in total. Melanie Fiona's song "It Kills Me" topped the chart for nine consecutive weeks, and ranked as the number three song on Billboards Hot R&B/Hip-Hop Songs year end list. It was replaced by Robin Thicke's "Sex Therapy", which peaked at number one for two consecutive weeks. "Sex Therapy" ranked as the number ten song on the Hot R&B/Hip-Hop Songs year end list. Drake topped the chart for a second time as a featured artist on Timbaland's song "Say Something". On April 3, Monica's  "Everything to Me" ascended to number, and remained atop the chart for a further six consecutive weeks. On May 22, Alicia Keys song "Un-Thinkable (I'm Ready)" topped the chart for twelve consecutive weeks. It ranked as the number one song on the Hot R&B/Hip-Hop Songs year end list. Usher's song "There Goes My Baby" peaked at number one for four weeks, and ranked as the number two song on the Hot R&B/Hip-Hop Songs year end list. Chris Brown's song "Deuces", featuring Tyga & Kevin McCall, topped the chart for nine consecutive weeks, and ranked as the number nine song on the Hot R&B/Hip-Hop Songs year end list. Trey Songz also topped the chart with "Can't Be Friends", a position it held for the final seven weeks of 2010.

List

See also
 2010 in music
 List of number-one rhythm and blues hits (United States)

References

2010
United States RandB Singles
Number-one RandB singles